Guri station is a train station on the Gyeongui-Jungang Line. It is located in Inchang-dong, Guri, behind GS Square, a large department store in the central city area. Guri station is in Gyeonggi-do, whereas the previous western station, Yangwon station, is in Seoul.

The station has the usual array of food and convenience stores typically found in Korean subway stations. A ticket office, cash machines, and automated ticketing dispensers are located upstairs.

It will become a transfer station to Seoul Subway Line 8 in 2023.

External links
 Station information from Korail

Metro stations in Guri
Seoul Metropolitan Subway stations
Railway stations opened in 2005